Kahkashan is an Indian television series about six great masters of modern Urdu and Islamic poetry: Hasrat Mohani, Jigar Moradabadi, Josh Malihabadi, Majaz Lucknawi, Firaq Gorakhpuri, and Makhdoom Mohiuddin. The serial was produced, researched and scripted by Ali Sardar Jafri and directed by Jalal Agha and telecast in 1991–1992. Music was scored by Jagjit Singh, the famous ghazal singer of India. The series was also shown on TV Asia channel USA in 2006.

Overview
It was Sardar Jafri's dream to make such a serial on Urdu writers as a tribute and also with the intent to popularize and expose the general Indian audience to the modern masters of Urdu poetry. The series was telecast in eighteen episodes in 1991–1992.

Cast
 Parikshit Sahni as Josh Malihabadi 
 Farooq Sheikh as Hasrat Mohani 
 Deepti Naval 
 Irfan Khan as  Makhdoom Mohiuddin
 Raj Zutshi as Jigar Moradabadi
 Tanvi Azmi
 Rakesh Pandey
 Manohar Singh as Firaq Gorakhpuri 
 Fawad Sherani
 Tom Alter
 Amar Ghaffar

External links
Kahkashan News Article
Kahkashan DVD Rating

DD National original programming
Indian drama television series
Urdu-language television shows
1991 Indian television series debuts
1992 Indian television series endings